The Sagebrusher is a 1920 American silent Western film directed by Edward Sloman and starring Roy Stewart, Marguerite De La Motte and Noah Beery.

Cast
 Roy Stewart as Dr. Barnes 
 Marguerite De La Motte as Mary Warren 
 Noah Beery as Sim Gage 
 Betty Brice as Annie Squires 
 Arthur Morrison as Wid Gardner 
 J. Gordon Russell as Big Aleck 
 Edwin Wallock as Frederick Waldhorn 
 Tom O'Brien as Charlie Dornewald 
 Aggie Herring as Mrs. Jensen

References

Bibliography
 Goble, Alan. The Complete Index to Literary Sources in Film. Walter de Gruyter, 1999.

External links
 

1920 films
1920 Western (genre) films
Films directed by Edward Sloman
1920s English-language films
Pathé Exchange films
American black-and-white films
Films distributed by W. W. Hodkinson Corporation
Silent American Western (genre) films
1920s American films